Zschiesche is a German language surname. Notable people with the name include:
 Karl-Wolfgang Zschiesche (1933–1996), German physician and pathologist
 Werner Zschiesche (1903–1974), German rower

References 

German-language surnames